Ab Gavan-e Kuchek (also Romanized as Āb Gāvān-e Kūchek) is a village in Vahdat Rural District, Mugarmun District, Landeh County, Kohgiluyeh and Boyer-Ahmad Province, Iran. At the 2006 census, its population was 71, in 12 families.

References 

Populated places in Landeh County